Kratika Sengar, also known as Kratika Sengar Dheer is an Indian actress who mainly appear on Indian Television. She made her debut in 2007 with Kasautii Zindagii Kay playing the role of Prerna Gill and also appeared in Kyunki Saas Bhi Kabhi Bahu Thi as Sanchi "Sugandi".

Kratika got her breakthrough in Jhansi Ki Rani. She later acted in Punar Vivah, in Service Wali Bahu and in Kasam Tere Pyaar Ki. She also appeared in the 2014 Bollywood film My Father Godfather.

Early life
Kratika Sengar was born in Kanpur, Uttar Pradesh in a Sengar Rajput family. She went to Methodist High School, Kanpur, and then moved to Delhi and graduated in Mass Communication from Amity University, Noida.

Personal life
Kratika Sengar married Nikitin Dheer, son of actor Pankaj Dheer, on 3 September 2014 in an arranged marriage. The couple has a daughter.

Career

Debut and early career (2007–2011)
Kratika Sengar started her acting career in 2007, in the series Kasautii Zindagii Kay, and in "Kyunki Saas Bhi Kabhi Bahu Thi" in 2008. She then bagged another Balaji Telefilms show Kya Dill Mein Hai in 2008. Later, she had a small guest appearance in Sony TV's comedy show Bura Na Mano Holi Hai. She also appeared in the reality show Lux Kaun Jeetega Bollywood ka Ticket.

In 2009, Sengar got her first main lead role with Zee TV's show Jhansi Ki Rani. She did a small cameo appearance in Balaji's show Kis Desh Mein Hai Meraa Dil. In 2010 she also appeared in an episodic appearance in Aahat.

Success and lead roles (2012–2015)
In 2012, Kratika made her comeback to television with Zee TV's show Punar Vivah opposite Gurmeet Choudhary. The show ended on 17 May 2013. While playing Aarti, she made an appearance on Qubool Hai to promote her show. In January 2014, she made a special appearance in Star Plus' show is Ek Veer Ki Ardaas...Veera. Later in the year, she entered Life OK's show Devon Ke Dev...Mahadev starring Mohit Raina and Mouni Roy before the show ended.

She made her film debut in 2014 with My Father Godfather. In 2015, Kratika acted in Zee TV's next Service Wali Bahu.

Establishment and further career (2016–present)
In 2016, Sengar appeared in Ekta Kapoor's show Kasam Tere Pyaar Ki. Her character was replaced by Shivani Tomar. She came back in September 2016. The show went off air on 27 July 2018.

In 2017, she acted as the Narrator in the show Chandrakanta. In 2021, she appeared in Choti Sarrdaarni.

Filmography

Television

Films

References

External links

 
 

Living people
Indian television actresses
Indian soap opera actresses
People from Kanpur
Actresses from Uttar Pradesh
Year of birth missing (living people)